Chester Albert Anderson (June 12, 1918 – November 19, 2008) was an American football and wrestling coach. He served as the head football coach at Buena Vista College in Storm Lake, Iowa from 1953 to 1954 and two stints as the head football coach Bemidji State University in Bemidji, Minnesota, from 1956 to 1960 and again in 1962 to 1965, compiling a career college football coaching record of 50–42–7. As football coach at Bemidji, Anderson had a record of 43–34–5 and won two conference titles. He was also the school's head wrestling coach from 1955 until his retirement in 1981.

Head coaching record

College football

References

External links
 NSIC Hall of Fame profile
 

1918 births
2008 deaths
Bemidji State Beavers football coaches
Buena Vista Beavers football coaches
College wrestling coaches in the United States
High school football coaches in Minnesota
People from Mellette County, South Dakota